The Kansas State Wildcats football team represents Kansas State University, in Manhattan Kansas.  The team competes in the Big 12 Conference at the NCAA Football Bowl Subdivision level. This is a list of their annual results.

Seasons

References

Kansas State Wildcats

Kansas State Wildcats football seasons